New Hamburg is an unincorporated community in Scott County, in the U.S. state of Missouri.

Demographics

History
New Hamburg was originally called Hamburg, and under the latter name was platted in 1866. The community was named after Hamburg, in Germany, the native land of a large share of the first settlers. A post office called New Hamburg was established in 1874, and remained in operation until 1972.

Notable person
 Leo A. Herbst (1883-1969), mayor of Perryville, Missouri, was born in New Hamburg

References

Unincorporated communities in Missouri
Unincorporated communities in Scott County, Missouri